Léonce is a French masculine given name. People with the name Léonce include:

Léonce (actor) (1823–1900), French actor and singer
Léonce Bekemans (born 1950), Belgian economist and scholar
Léonce-Henri Burel (1892–1977), French cinematographer
Léonce Corne (1894–1977), French film actor
Léonce Lagarde (1860–1936), French colonial governor of French Somaliland and ambassador
Léonce Perret (1880–1935), French film actor, director and producer
Léonce Rosenberg (1879–1947), French art historian, art collector and publisher 
Léonce Verny (1837–1908), French officer and naval engineer

French masculine given names